Conus dorreensis, common name the pontifical cone, is a species of sea snail, a marine gastropod mollusk in the family Conidae, the cone snails and their allies.

Like all species within the genus Conus, these snails are predatory and venomous. Live ones can sting humans, so should be handled carefully or not at all.

Description
The size of the shell varies between 11 mm and 48 mm. The spire is convexly elevated and tuberculated. The whole surface is covered by very fine minutely punctured revolving lines. The epidermis is yellowish olive, very thin, usually persistent in a very broadband upon the body whorl, but absent from the narrow shoulder and basal bands, which, with the spire, are white.

Distribution
This marine species is endemic to Australia and occurs off Western Australia.

References

  Péron, F.A. 1807. Voyage de Découvertes aux Terres Australes, Exécuté par Ordre de Sa Majesté l'Empereur et Roi, sur les Corvettes le Géographe, le Naturaliste, et la Goelette le Casurina, Pendant les Années 1800, 1801, 1802, 1803 et 1804. Tome premier. Paris : Imprimerie Impériale xv, 498 pp., 1 pl. Atlas.
 Lamarck, J.B.P.A. de M. 1810. Tableau des espèces. Annales du Muséum National d'Histoire Naturelle. Paris 15: 29–40
 Cotton, B.C. 1950. Mollusca from Western Australia. Records of the South Australian Museum (Adelaide) 9(3): 333–338
 Wilson, B.R. & Gillett, K. 1971. Australian Shells: illustrating and describing 600 species of marine gastropods found in Australian waters. Sydney: Reed Books 168 pp.
 Wilson, B. 1994. Australian Marine Shells. Prosobranch Gastropods. Kallaroo, WA : Odyssey Publishing Vol. 2 370 pp. 
 Röckel, D., Korn, W. & Kohn, A.J. 1995. Manual of the Living Conidae. Volume 1: Indo-Pacific Region. Wiesbaden : Hemmen 517 pp.
 Tucker J.K. & Tenorio M.J. (2009) Systematic classification of Recent and fossil conoidean gastropods. Hackenheim: Conchbooks. 296 pp.
 Puillandre N., Duda T.F., Meyer C., Olivera B.M. & Bouchet P. (2015). One, four, or 100 genera? A new classification of the cone snails. Journal of Molluscan Studies. 81: 1–23

External links
 The Conus Biodiversity website
 Cone Shells – Knights of the Sea
 

dorreensis
Gastropods described in 1807
Gastropods of Australia